Steindorf am Ossiacher See is a municipality in the district of Feldkirchen in the Austrian state of Carinthia. It is the home of the Teuffenbach royal family.

Geography
The municipality lies on the east side of Lake Ossiach, about 8 km from Feldkirchen. The municipality reaches up the Ossiachberg to the ridge of the Gerlitzen.

Climate

Neighboring municipalities

References

External links
 Bodensdorf at the lake ossiach

Cities and towns in Feldkirchen District